A moving violation is any violation of the law committed by the driver of a vehicle while it is in motion. The term "moving" distinguishes it from other motor vehicle violations, such as paperwork violations (which include violations involving vehicle insurance, registration, and inspection), parking violations, or equipment violations. The United States Department of State makes reference to moving violations in its enforcement guidance.

Types 

While some violations, like parking violations, are civil matters involving a vehicle's owner, moving violations are charged against the actual driver.

Moving violations are usually classified as infractions or misdemeanors, but serious violations such as hit and run, driving under the influence, and road rage can be considered felonies.

Costs 
Moving violation convictions typically result in fines and demerit points assessed to the license of the driver. As a driver accumulates points, they may be required to attend defensive driving lessons, re-take their driving test, pay additional taxes, or even surrender their license.  Additionally, moving violations often increase insurance premiums. Drivers with more points on their driving record often must pay more for car insurance than drivers with fewer.

Sometimes tickets are used in a speed trap as a form of fundraising. For example, a local government that is suffering a budget shortfall may ticket more aggressively within its jurisdiction to increase revenue.

In the United States, citation fines can vary widely between jurisdictions for the same behavior, usually between $25 and $1,000. In countries such as Finland however, they are specific proportions of the violator's income, and fines in excess of $100,000 can be assessed to wealthy individuals. In Canada, each province is individual in how they treat similar behavior and each violation usually includes a set fine and demerit points against the driver's license. For example, a speeding ticket in Ontario of 50+ km over is 6 demerit points against the driver's license with the approximate fine calculated as (km over x 9.75) x 1.25, as well it carries a one-week automatic license suspension and car impoundment. In Manitoba speeding in excess of 49 km is 10 demerit points and a fine of 672 dollars and a Serious Offence Licence Suspension.

Examples of moving violations

speeding, which can be exceeding a limit or (in some jurisdictions) simply driving at an unsafe speed
driving significantly below the speed limit to the point of obstructing traffic
tailgating or failing to maintain an assured clear distance ahead
driving past a stop sign or red traffic light without stopping
failure to yield to another vehicle with the right-of-way
failure to signal for turns or lane changes
improper lane usage, such as failing to drive within a single lane
crossing over a center divider, median, or gore
driving on the shoulder where it is considered illegal under certain conditions
failure to use a seat belt
illegal use of window tints and obstructions
failure to stop for a pedestrian in a crosswalk
failure to stop for a school bus when children are boarding or exiting (in certain jurisdictions)
failure to secure a load to a truck, lorry, or other vehicle
driving in a car pool lane illegally
operating a telecommunications device while driving (in jurisdictions that prohibit this)
driving a vehicle outside the conditions of one's license
driving without a license or with a suspended license or with a license from another country
driving a vehicle in a bus lane or on railway tracks
failure to stop after a traffic collision or make a report
driving on the wrong side of the road, unless there is an obstruction

More serious moving violations include:
driving under the influence
reckless driving or dangerous driving
street racing
vehicular homicide

Moving violations and driving records 
Exactly how long moving violations stay on a driving record depends on jurisdictional laws; for example, in New York, minor moving violations can stay on a driving record abstract for a maximum of four years. Whereas minor moving violations tend to stay on a person's abstract for only a few years, some serious moving violations are classified as criminal offenses that result in a criminal record that may be maintained for life.

See also 
Traffic enforcement
Traffic ticket
Traffic court
Traffic school

References 

Crimes
Traffic law